Krystyna Gozdawa-Nocoń (6 March 1949 – 18 December 2021) was a Polish politician. A member of the Labour Union and the Democratic Left Alliance, she served as Deputy Voivode of Pomeranian Voivodeship from 2003 to 2006.

References

1949 births
2021 deaths
21st-century Polish women politicians
21st-century Polish politicians
Democratic Left Alliance politicians
Labour Union (Poland) politicians
Politicians from Gdańsk